Herschel "Tex" Evans (9 March 1909 – 9 February 1939) was an American tenor saxophonist who was a member of the Count Basie Orchestra. He also worked with Lionel Hampton and Buck Clayton. He is also known for starting his cousin Joe McQueen's interest in the saxophone. Joe McQueen, living until 2019 at age 100, may well have been the last surviving person to have known Herschel during his lifetime.

Life and career
Evans was born in Denton, Texas, but spent some of his childhood in Kansas City, Kansas, where his cousin Eddie Durham was a trombonist and guitarist. Durham persuaded him to switch from alto to tenor saxophone, the instrument that ultimately established Evans's reputation. After perfecting his craft in the jam sessions held in the jazz district between Twelfth and Eighteenth streets in Kansas City, Evans returned to Texas in the 1920s and joined the Troy Floyd orchestra in San Antonio in 1929. He stayed with this territory band until it dispersed in 1932. Evans performed for a time with Lionel Hampton and Buck Clayton in Los Angeles, and in the mid-1930s returned to Kansas City to become a featured soloist in Count Basie's big band.

For the next three years, Evans's prominence as a tenor saxophonist was at its peak, and he participated in musical duels with fellow band member Lester Young. Count Basie's "One O'Clock Jump" featured the contrasting styles of the two musicians and brought to each the praise of both critics and the general public. Evans's greatest single success was his featured solo on Basie's hit "Blue and Sentimental."

Evans also made records with jazz musicians such as Harry James, Teddy Wilson, and Lionel Hampton. Evans has been credited with influencing fellow tenorist Buddy Tate — who, in 1939, came from the Nat Towles band in Omaha to replace Evans in the Basie band when he died. He is also credited for influencing Illinois Jacquet and Arnett Cobb. Although not a prolific composer, Evans wrote "Texas Shuffle" and "Doggin' Around", among other pieces.

Death 
Evans was a member of the Basie Orchestra from September 1936 until his death.

Evans became ill while playing with Basie at the Howard Theatre in Washington, D.C., sometime during the week from January 13 to January 19, 1939. He didn't feel well enough to make the Basie band's session with Decca on February 3; Chu Berry substituted. He collapsed while performing a one-nighter on February 6 with the Basie band at the Crystal Ballroom in Hartford, Connecticut; he was rushed to Wadsworth Hospital in New York City at 629 West 185th Street.

Evans died February 9, 1939, at the age of 29 of heart disease in New York City while the Basie band was playing a one-nighter in Toledo, Ohio. His body was transferred to Los Angeles and interred on February 14, St. Valentine's Day, at Angelus-Rosedale Cemetery.

Basie's recording session in New York with Decca on January 5, 1939, was Evans’ final recording.

 Count Basie And His Orchestra, Decca 2249
 Buck Clayton, Ed Lewis, Shad Collins, Harry Edison (trumpets); Dicky Wells, Dan Minor, Benny Morton (trombones); Earle Warren (alto sax); Herschel Evans, Lester Young (tenor saxes); Jack Washington (alto and bari sax); Count Basie (piano); Freddie Green (guitar); Walter Page (bass); Jo Jones (drums); Helen Humes (vocals)
 Both numbers were arranged by Jimmy Mundy and Helen Humes sang on both
 Recorded in New York, January 5, 1939
 64851-A "My Heart Belongs to Daddy"; 
 65852-A "Sing for Your Supper";

Orchestra memberships 

Evans was a member of the following orchestras:

 Smith Brothers Orchestra
 Trent's Number Two — Evans performed with TNT in 1927
 St. Louis Merrymakers — Evans performed when them around 1928
 Edgar Battle
 Terrence Holder
 George Corley
 Troy Floyd (1901–1953) and His Shadowland Orchestra, San Antonio — Evans performed with Floyd from 1929 to 1932
 Lee Palmer
 Mamie Smith (1883–1946)
 Durham Brothers Orchestra
 Joseph Durham, Jr. (brother), director, double bass, and tuba
 Earl Durham (brother)
 Roosevelt Durham (brother)
 Eddie Durham (1906–1987) (brother)
  Myrtle Durham (sister), piano
 Allen Durham (cousin), trombone
 Clyde Durham (cousin)
 Ed Bailey Orchestra
 Charles Echoles (né Charles Richard Echols; 1901–1957)
 Bennie Moten — Evans performed with Moten from 1933 to 1935
 Lionel Hampton — Evans performed for stints with Hampton in 1936
 Buck Clayton — Evans performed for stints with Clayton in 1936
 Count Basie — Evans performed with Basie from 1937 until his death

Selected discography and sessionography 

 Compilation
 Count Basie, The Original American Decca Recordings (GRP, 1937-39 [1992]); 

 Original sessions
 Troy Floyd and His Shadowland Orchestra
 Recorded in San Antonio, Texas, June 21, 1929
 402696-B: "Dreamland Blues," part 1 (pt 1); 
 402697-B: "Dreamland Blues," part 2 (pt 2); 

 Richard M. Jones: Jones' Chicago Cosmopolitans
 Recorded in Chicago, September 13, 1935
 90323-A: "Joe Louis Chant"
 90324-A: "Baby O'Mine"

 Count Basie And His Orchestra
 Buck Clayton, Joe Keyes, Carl Smith (trumpets); George Hunt, Dan Minor (trombones); Caughey Roberts (alto saxes); Herschel Evans, Lester Young (tenor saxes); Jack Washington (baritone sax); Count Basie (piano); Claude Williams (guitar); Walter Page (bass); Jo Jones (drums); Jimmy Rushing (vocals)
 Recorded in New York, January 21, 1937
 61542-A: "Honeysuckle Rose", Decca 1141; 
 61543-A: "Pennies From Heaven", Decca 1121, (Swi)M-39027, Br (E)02379, 80163,
 61544-A: "Swingin' at the Daisy Chain," Decca 1121
 61545-A: "Roseland Shuffle," Decca 1141; 

 Count Basie
 Claude Williams (guitar, violin 1); Leslie Williams (master of ceremonies)
 Radio broadcast, live "The Chatterbox", William Penn Hotel, Pittsburgh, Pennsylvania, February 8, 1937
 "Lady Be Good
 "St. Louis Blues"
 "Moten Swing" (theme and closing)
 "Shoe Shine Swing" ("Roseland Shuffle")
 "Moten Swing" (theme and close)

Selected compositions 
 "Doggin' Around"
 Words and music by Edgar Battle and Herschel Evans
 Copyright September 19, 1938
 Class E (musical composition, unpublished) 177494
 Lewis Music Publishing Co., New York

 "Texas Shuffle"
 Words and music by Edgar Battle and Herschel Evans
 1st copy October 17, 1938
 Class E (musical composition, unpublished) 179121
 Lewis Music Publishing Co., New York

Edgar Battle sued Lewis Publishing Company in 1952 for failing to adequately promote songs that he published with them.

Notes

References

Original copyrights
Catalog of Copyright Entries, Part 3 Musical Compositions, New Series, Library of Congress, Copyright Office

External links

[ All Music]

1909 births
1939 deaths
Count Basie Orchestra members
American jazz saxophonists
American male saxophonists
People from Denton, Texas
Jazz musicians from Texas
20th-century American musicians
20th-century saxophonists
American male jazz musicians
Burials at Angelus-Rosedale Cemetery
20th-century American male musicians